ZipZoomfly was an internet retailer for computer parts and related products.  Based in Newark, California, ZipZoomfly was founded in May 1999 under the name XtraPlus. The site relaunched in January 2000 as Googlegear. ZipZoomfly is a U.S. service mark of Xtraplus Corporation.

Name change 
A formal complaint by Google to an ICANN domain-name dispute resolution provider led to the company changing its name from Googlegear to ZipZoomFly in 2003. The domain googlegear.com is now owned by Google, and http://www.googlegear.com redirected to a Google page that used to explain that Googlegear had never been associated with Google and provided a link to zipzoomfly.com, but it now displays an HTTP 404 error.

Mascot 
The original mascot of Googlegear was a smiling bean-shaped cartoon character as the first letter "O" in the name. Named GoogleGuy, the mascot was shown giving a thumbs-up sign with one of his two floating hands. The U.S. trademark filing describes GoogleGuy as an edible nut without a shell. Nevertheless, the website claimed that GoogleGuy was neither a bean nor a pancake, but a numeral "zero" from the virtual googol of products they carried.

The mascot still appears in the logo for ZipZoomfly.

Claims of fraud 
Several customers have accused ZipZoomFly of committing "rebate fraud" or promising good deals on technology once rebates are applied. Several reports have indicated that the company often fails to follow up on rebates, often making false claims of refunding money lost through rebate fraud.

On January 5, 2011, this company's Better Business Bureau (BBB) accreditation was revoked due to failure to respond to one or more customer complaints filed with the BBB.

, the company's BBB rating was once again listed as their highest rating: A+.
Their web site has been continuously marked "closed for maintenance" since August 21, 2011.

, the website has been updated to read:

, the website has been taken offline.

References

External links
ZipZoomfly's website 
ZipZoomfly's ResellerRatings.com Page

Online retailers of the United States
1998 establishments in California
Companies based in Newark, California
Retail companies established in 1998
Internet properties established in 1998